The Federal Executive Council or simply the Executive Council of the Autonomous Administration of North and East Syria, acts as a joint coordination committee that oversees the implementation of policies developed by the Federal Assembly of the Syrian Democratic Council.

Origins and history of the Executive Council

Origins of the institution 
The ministers are appointed; general elections were planned to be held before the end of 2014, but this was postponed due to fighting.

Council composition 
Among other stipulations outlined is a quota of 40% for women's participation in government, as well as another quota for youth. In connection with a decision to introduce affirmative action for ethnic minorities, all governmental organizations and offices are based on a co-presidential system.

Restructuring of the DFNS executive in the autumn of 2018 
After the creation on September 6 of the new unified administration in the areas controlled by the SDF, "Autonomous Administration of North, East Syria", Mrs. Berivan Khalid (or Khaled) and Abdul Hamid al-Mahbash were elected co-chairmen of Executive Body of the Administration.
In the first meeting of the Executive Council held on 3 October 2018 in Ain Issa town, the co-chairs of the nine Authorities of the Executive Council were elected:
Interior Committee: Ali Mustafa Hajo (علي مصطفى حجو) – Hevi (Hifi) Ibrahim Mustafa (هيفي ابراهيم مصطفى)
Education Committee: Kawthar Doko (Kuthar Duku, كوثر دوكو) - Rajab al-Meshlaf (رجب المشلف)
Local Administration Committee: Joseph (Juzif) Lahdo (جوزيف لحدو) - Media Bozan (Maydia Bouzan, ميديا بوزان)
Economics and Agriculture Committee: Salman Tawfiq al-Baroudo (سلمان توفيق البارودو) - Amal al-Khazim (أمل الخزيم)
Finance Committee: Walat Haj Ali (ولات حاج علي) - Salwa al-Sayid (سلوى السيد)
Culture Committee: Abdul Satar Shakagi (عبدالستار شكاغي) - Aisha Ali Rajab (عائشة علي رجب)
Health and Environment Committee: Dr. Jwan Mustafa (الدكتور جوان مصطفى) – Khetam Khalil al-Jeld (ختام خليل الجلد)
Social Affairs Committee: Farouq al-Mashi (فاروق الماشي) - Berivan Hasan (بيريفان حسن)
Women's Committee: Jihan Khadro (جيهان خضرو)
Sometime later (first publications in December), the former official spokeswoman of "Wrath of the Euphrates" campaign Jihan Sheikh Ahmed was elected co-chair of the Defense Committee, one of two special offices of the Executive Council (the second is the self-defense committee), whose forming was assumed shortly after the creation of the initial nine committees.
At the moment, it remains unclear whether the new administrative structure will completely replace the old one or it will only complement it.

Operation of the Executive Council

Council meetings

Decisions and responsibilities 
The Council assists with coordination and collaboration between cantons in political, economic, social and cultural matters; particularly that of diplomatic and military matters. It also supervises and follows the work of federal Departments and Ministries.

Constitutional conventions 
Due to the Executive Council's unique nature as a voluntary grand coalition of political opponents, its operation is subject to constitutional conventions.

Members of the Executive Council

The current members of the Executive Council are:

References

2015 establishments in Syria
2015 in the Autonomous Administration of North and East Syria
Politics of the Autonomous Administration of North and East Syria